Glebe is a townland in County Westmeath, Ireland.

Glebe is one of 15 townlands of the civil parish of Leny in the barony of Corkaree in the Province of Leinster. The neighbouring townlands are: Ballinalack to the north and Cullenhugh to the south.

In the 1911 census of Ireland there was 1 house and 4 inhabitants in the townland.

Glebe was the name given to an area of land within an ecclesiastical parish used to support a parish priest. As a townland name it is repeated many times across the country.

References

External links
Glebe at the IreAtlas Townland Data Base
Glebe at Townlands.ie
Glebe at Logainm.ie

Townlands of County Westmeath